ISO 16610: Geometrical product specifications (GPS) – Filtration is a standard series on filters for surface texture, and provides guidance on the use of these filters in various applications.
Filters are used in surface texture in order reduce the bandwidth of analysis in order to obtain functional correlation with physical phenomena such as friction, wear, adhesion, etc. For example, filters are used to separate roughness and waviness from the primary profile, or to create a multiscale decomposition in order to identify the scale at which a phenomenon occurs. 
Historically, the first roughness measuring instruments - stylus profilometer - used to have electronic filters made of capacitors and resistors that filtered out low frequencies in order to retain frequencies that represent roughness. Later, digital filters replaced analog filters and international standards such as ISO 11562 for the Gaussian filter were published.

Filter toolbox for surface texture 

Today, a full set of filters is described in the ISO 16610 standard series. This standard is part of the GPS standards on Geometrical Product Specification and Verification, developed by ISO TC 213.

Filter matrix 
ISO 16610 is composed of two families of documents, one for profiles (open and closed) and one for surfaces. A general introduction is provided in:
 ISO 16610-1: Overview and basic concepts (published in 2015)

Profile filters 
Profile filters are defined for open profiles, measured along a line by profilometers and expressed as z=f(x), as well as for closed profiles, measured around a circular component by roundness instruments and expressed as radius=f(angle). Most of these standards were first published as a Technical Specification (TS) and later converted to International Standards or withdrawn.

Parts related to profile filters are:
 ISO 16610-20:  Linear profile filters: Basic concepts (published in 2015)
 ISO 16610-21:  Linear profile filters: Gaussian filters (published in 2011)
 ISO 16610-22:  Linear profile filters: Spline filters (published in 2015)
 ISO 16610-28:  Linear profile filters: End effects (published in 2016)
 ISO 16610-29:  Linear profile filters: Spline wavelets (published in 2015)
 ISO 16610-30:  Robust profile filters: Basic concepts (published in 2015)
 ISO 16610-31:  Robust profile filters: Gaussian regression filters (published in 2016)
 ISO 16610-32:  Robust profile filters: Spline filters (published as a TS in 2009)
 ISO 16610-40:  Morphological profile filters: Basic concepts (published in 2015)
 ISO 16610-41:  Morphological profile filters: Disc and horizontal line-segment filters (published in 2015)
 ISO 16610-45:  Morphological profile filters: Segmentation filters (planned for the future)
 ISO 16610-49:  Morphological profile filters: Scale space techniques (published in 2015)

Note: ISO/TS 16610-32 on robust spline filters was published as a technical specification in 2009 but was withdrawn in 2015.

Areal filters 
Areal filters are defined for surfaces measured either by lateral scanning instruments or optical profilometers. 
Parts related to areal filters are:
 ISO 16610-60: Linear areal filter: Basic concepts (published in 2015)
 ISO 16610-61: Linear areal filter: Gaussian filters (published in 2015)
 ISO 16610-62: Linear areal filter: Spline filters
 ISO 16610-68: Linear areal filter: End-effects (planned for the future)
 ISO 16610-69: Linear areal filter: Spline wavelets
 ISO 16610-70: Robust areal filter: Basic concepts
 ISO 16610-71: Robust areal filter: Gaussian regression filters (published in 2014)
 ISO 16610-80: Morphological areal filter: Basic concepts
 ISO 16610-81: Morphological areal filter: Sphere and horizontal planar segment filters
 ISO 16610-85: Morphological areal filter: Segmentation (published in 2013)
 ISO 16610-89: Morphological areal filter: Scale space techniques

Guide for the use of filters in surface texture 
The following section describes which application is suitable for each filter. References to published papers or books are provided when available. Readers are encouraged to add below proven applications related to surface texture and tribology where a particular filter can be used alone or in conjunction with other treatments or analyses to provide significant results.

 Part 21 - Profile Gaussian filter
 Microroughness filtering (lambda S)
 Separation of roughness and waviness profiles (lambda C)
 Band-pass filtering

 Part 22 - Profile Spline filter

 Part 29 - Profile Spline wavelets

 Part 31 - Profile Robust Gaussian filter

 Part 41 - Profile Morphological filter

 Part 45 - Profile Segmentation filter

 Part 49 - Profile Scale space technique

 Part 61 - Areal Gaussian filter
 Microroughness S-Filter
 L-Filter for the generation of the roughness S-L surface

 Part 62 - Areal Spline filter

 Part 71 - Areal Robust regression Gaussian filter
 Microroughness S-Filter on stratified and structured surfaces
 L-Filter for the generation of the roughness S-L surface on stratified and structured surfaces
 F-Filter for the generation of S-F surface
 Outlier detection
 
 Part 81 - Areal Morphological filter
 F-Filter used to flatten a surface with the upper or lower envelope
 Tip deconvolution of AFM instrument

 Part 85 - Areal Segmentation filter
 Identification of structures (grains, pores, cells, ...)
 Automatic leveling of MEMS

 Part 89 - Areal Scale space technique

See also 
 ISO 25178: areal surface texture standard
 Surface roughness
 Gaussian filter

Bibliography 

 BAKUCZ P, 2013, Spline filtering in accordance to ISO/TS 16610: ANSI C-code for engineers,  8th IEEE conf. on applied comput. intel. informatics
 BAKUCZ P, KRÜGER-SEHM R, 2009, A  new  wavelet  filtering  for  analysis  of  fractal  engineering  surfaces, Wear
 BLATEYRON F, 2014, Good practices for the use of areal filters, 3rd Seminar on surface metrology of the Americas, Albuquerque.
 BRINKMANN S, BODSCHWINNA H, LEMKE H W, 2001, Accessing  roughness  in  three-dimensions  using Gaussian regression filtering, Int. J of mach. tools manuf.
 DEMIRCI I, MEZGHANI S, YOUSFI M, EL MANSORI M, 2013, Multiscale analysis of the roughness effect on lubricated rough contact, J of tribology
 DOBRZANSKI P, PAWLUS P, 2010, Digital filtering of surface topography: part II, applications of robust and valley suppression filters, Prec. eng., 01/2010
 FRIIS K S, GODI A, DE CHIFFRE L, 2011,  Characterization  and  robust  filtering  of  multifunctional  surfaces using ISO standards, Meas. sci. technol. 22 125101
 GOTO T, MIYAKURA J, UMEDA K, KADOWAKI S, 2005, A robust spline filter on the basis of L2-norm, Prec. eng.
 GURAU L, IRLE M, MANSFIELD-WILLIAMS H, 2013, Minimising the computation time of using a robust Gaussian regression filter on sanded wood surfaces, Pro Ligno, 8(3):3-11
 HANADA H, SAITO T, HASEGAWA M, YANAGI K, 2008, Sophisticated  filtration  technique  for  3D  surface topography data of rectangular area, Wear, 264(5):422-427
 JIANG X, SCOTT P J, WHITEHOUSE D, 2008, Wavelets and their applications for surface metrology, CIRP Annals manuf. tech., 57:555-558
 KONDO Y, NUMADA M, KOSHIMIZU H, 2014, A robust Gaussian filter  corresponding to the  transmission characteristic of the Gaussian filter, J of physics conf. series, 483(1):012016.
 KRYSTEK M, 2010, ISO filters in precision engineering and production measurement, Meas. sci. technol.
 KRYSTEK M, 2005, Spline filters for surface texture analysis, Key eng. materials
 KRYSTEK M, 1996, A fast gauss filtering algorithm for roughness measurements, Prec. eng.
 KUMAR J, SHUNMUGAM M S, 2006, A  new  approach  for  filtering  surface  profiles  using  morphological operations,  Int. J of mach. tools manuf., 46(3):260-270
 LI H, JIANG X, LI Z, 2004, Robust estimation in Gaussian filtering for engineering surface characterization, Prec. eng. 28(2):186-193
 LINGADURAI K, SHUNMUGAM M S, 2006, Metrological characteristics of wavelet filters used for engineering surfaces, Measurements
 LINGADURAI K, SHUNMUGAM M S, 2005, Use of morphological closing filters for three-dimensional filtering of engineering surfaces, J of manuf. syst., 24(4):366-376
 LIU X, RAJA J, 1996, Analyzing engineering surface texture using wavelet filter, Proc. SPIE
 LOU S, JIANG X, SCOTT P J, 2013, Correlating motif analysis and morphological filters for surface texture analysis, Measurement, 46(2):993-1001, ISSN 0263-2241
 LOU S, JIANG X, SCOTT P J, 2012, Algorithms for morphological profile filters and their comparison, Prec. Eng., 36(3):414-423
 MURALIKRISHNAN B, REN W, STANFIELD E, EVERETT D, ZHENG A, DOIRON T, 2013, Applications of profile filtering in the dimensional metrology of fuel cell plates, Meas. sci. technol. 24 065003
 NUMADA M, NOMURA T, YANAGI K, KAMIYAMA K, TASHIRO H, 2007, High-order spline filter and ideal low-pass filter at the limit of its order, Prec. eng.
 PODULKA P, PAWLUS P, DOBRZANSKI P, LENART A, 2014, Spikes removal in surface measurement, J of physics conf. series, 483(1):012025 
 RAJA J, MURALIKRISHNAN B, FU S, 2002, Recent advances in separation of roughness, waviness and form, Prec. eng.
 SEEWIG J, EIFER M, 2014, Periodic Gaussian filter according to ISO 16610-21 for closed profiles, Prec. Eng. 38(2):439-442.
 SEEWIG J, 2005, Linear and robust Gaussian regression filters, J of physics conf. series, 13(1):254
 THOLATH J, RADHAKRISHNAN V, 1999, Three-dimensional  filtering  of  engineering  surfaces  using envelope system, Prec. eng., 23:221-228
 VERMEULEN M, SCHEERS J, 2000, Robust  filtering  applied  to  sheet  metal  surfaces,  Xth  Int.  coll. on surfaces, Chemnitz
 VOLK R, VILLE J-F, 2007, Filters for contour measurement, Wear, 264(5):469-473
 XIN B, 2009, Multiscale  analysis of rough groove textures for three-dimensional optical measurements, Opt. eng., 48(7)
 YUAN Y, VORBURGER T V, SONG J F, RENEGAR T B, 2000, A simplified  realization  for  the  Gaussian filter in surface metrology, Xth Int. coll. on surfaces, Chemnitz
 ZELELEW H, KHASAWNEH M, ABBAS A, 2014, Wavelet-based  characterization  of  asphalt  pavement surface macro-structure, Road materials and pavement design, 15(3) 
 ZENG W, JIANG X, SCOTT P J, 2011, A generalised linear and nonlinear spline filter, Wear, 271:544-547
 ZENG H, JIANG X, SCOTT P J, 2010, Fast algorithm of the robust Gaussian regression filter for areal surface analysis, Meas. sci. technol., 21(5):055108tech., 59(1):573-576
 ZHANG H, YUAN Y, HUA J, CHENG Y, 2014, High-order  spline  filter:  design  and  application  to  surface metrology, Prec. eng.
 ZHANG H, YUAN Y, PIAO W  A, 2010, Universal  spline  filter  for  surface  metrology,  Measurement, 43(10):1575-1582

16610
Metrology